KSER (90.7 FM) is a non-commercial radio station and airs a mix of music and news/public affairs. The station, which is owned and operated by the non-profit KSER Foundation, broadcasts at 90.7 MHz with an ERP of 5.8 kW and is licensed to Everett, Washington.

History
KSER's roots trace back to 1962, when KRAB signed on at 107.7 MHz. This Seattle radio station, later owned by the Jack Straw Memorial Foundation, provided an eclectic mix of jazz, world music, Pacifica radio features, and much more. But the station was also dangerously close to insolvency. Its management realized the station could be sold to a commercial broadcaster and an endowment was created, allowing the foundation to broadcast in the non-commercial part of the radio dial, which exists between 88.1 MHz and 91.9 MHz. The owners of KRAB originally applied to share time with KNHC, owned by the Seattle Public Schools. However, this action was seen by the school district as a hostile take-over bid. Ultimately, the owners got a license for 90.7 MHz in Everett, Washington. The Seattle frequency was sold and became KMGI (now today's KNDD).

Six years later, on February 9, 1991, KSER signed on from its studios in nearby Lynnwood, Washington. By 1994 the foundation sold the station to its current owners, who relocated the studios to Everett and its transmitter to Lake Stevens, Washington, giving them complete coverage in Snohomish County. Although its signal also reaches King County, coverage is limited due to signal coverage from KVTI: Tacoma, which broadcasts adjacent at 90.9 MHz. KVTI can't be heard in most of Snohomish County, Washington.

In the fall of 2013, the KSER Foundation signed on a second signal: 89.9 KXIR, Freeland. The second tower is located on Whidbey Island in the town of Freeland. At present, KSER and KXIR simulcast programming.

As of 2014, KSER has a board of directors, staff, and over 100 volunteers.  KSER's programming consists of news, public affairs, talk and diversified music shows and world news from the BBC.

Jack Straw Foundation 
Jack Straw Foundation founded in 1962, with the goal of starting KRAB-FM. On the first day, its transmitter blew up. The Foundation also started KBOO and KSER and assisted KDNA. KRAB's frequency was sold in 1984. In 1989 Jack Straw moved to  Roosevelt Way. The Jack Straw Foundation was named after a leader of the English Peasant Revolt of 1381.

See also
List of community radio stations in the United States

References

External links
KSER

KRAB Archive (Audio, program guides, photos, and history)

SER
Everett, Washington
Community radio stations in the United States
Radio stations established in 1991
Mass media in Snohomish County, Washington